Sophie Marie Perry (born 11 November 1986) is a footballer who plays as a full back for Thai Women's League club Chonburi FC. She previously played for Reading, Brighton & Hove Albion, Chelsea and Millwall. She has represented England (where she was born) and the Republic of Ireland at under-23 and senior international levels, respectively.

Club career
Perry started her career at Brighton & Hove Albion before moving to Chelsea. She joined Reading in July 2016.

In January 2017, Perry rejoined Brighton & Hove Albion. In January 2019, she joined Championship club Lewes on loan for the remainder of the 2018–19 season.

Perry accepted a job as a PE teacher at St. Andrews International School, Green Valley in summer 2019, bringing her professional playing career to an end. She set up a girls' football academy in Thailand. In September 2020, Perry signed with Thai Women's League champions Chonburi F.C.

International career

In February 2012 Perry received her first call-up to the senior Republic of Ireland squad, for the 2012 Algarve Cup. 
She made her debut with the Irish national team against Wales at the second game of the Algarve Cup on 3 March 2012. The match finished in a 0–0 draw.

In July 2013 Perry played for Ireland at the Summer Universiade in Kazan.

References

External links

Sophie Perry at FAI
Sophie Perry at Chelsea FC
 Women's Page at BHA

1986 births
Living people
Footballers from Brighton
English people of Irish descent
English women's footballers
England women's under-23 international footballers
Republic of Ireland women's association footballers
Republic of Ireland women's international footballers
Women's association football defenders
Brighton & Hove Albion W.F.C. players
Chelsea F.C. Women players
Millwall Lionesses L.F.C. players
Reading F.C. Women players
Lewes F.C. Women players
FA Women's National League players
Women's Super League players